Stuart Munn (22 December 1872 – 21 August 1959) was a Scottish professional footballer who played as a wing half.

References

1872 births
1959 deaths
Footballers from Greenock
Scottish footballers
Association football wing halves
Third Lanark A.C. players
Burnley F.C. players
Grimsby Town F.C. players
Manchester City F.C. players
Watford F.C. players
Hitchin Town F.C. players
Maryhill F.C. players
English Football League players
Scottish Football League players
Southern Football League players
Scottish Junior Football Association players